Tiernan Brady is an Irish-Australian political and LGBT rights campaigner who was involved in the campaigns to allow same-sex marriage in Ireland and Australia. He was the executive director of the Equality Campaign in Australia, the successful national campaign for Australian Marriage Equality. He was the political director of Ireland's successful "Yes Equality" campaign which saw Ireland become the first country in the world to introduce marriage equality by a public vote. He was the Director of Gay HIV Strategies in GLEN – The Irish Gay and Lesbian Equality Network, and is Campaign Director of Equal Future 2018.

Politics
Brady was elected to Bundoran Town Council in 1999 and re-elected in 2004. He twice served as council chair. In 2005 Brady introduced Ireland's first derelict property tax to address underdevelopment and hoarding of properties by developers.

As council chair, Brady proposed the creation of special coastal conservation zones to prevent residential zoning in areas of natural beauty. These proposals pitted him against councillors from his own party, Fianna Fáil, but they passed. In 2007 Brady let it be known that he would not stand again.

From 2000 to 2007 he served as Director of Organisation for Pat "the Cope" Gallagher, MEP and Mary Coughlan, TD.

In October 2013 Brady announced that he would seek to be the Fianna Fáil candidate in the Dublin constituency for the 2014 European elections but was unsuccessful.

In October 2018, Brady announced his intention to seek the Fianna Fáil nomination for the Dublin constituency in the European Parliament.

Equality campaigner – Ireland
In 2009 Brady became Director of Gay HIV Strategies with GLEN – The Gay and Lesbian Equality Network. GLEN successfully lobbied to pass the Civil Partnership Act in 2011. In April 2013 Brady addressed the Constitutional Convention to argue for marriage equality. In 2012 he led the successful bid for Dublin to host the 15th Annual Conference of the International Lesbian and Gay Association – Europe (ILGA-Europe) and chaired the conference organising committee. The ILGA conference is the largest of its kind in Europe with delegates from over 40 countries attending.

In the summer of 2014 the Irish government announced that there would a referendum on marriage equality in May 2015. Yes Equality became the main campaign for the Yes side. In tis first major activity Brady headed up the Register to Vote campaign aimed to increase enrolment in advance of the vote. The campaign was a huge success enrolling over 40,000 new voters making it the most successful enrolment campaign in the country's history.

Brady then became the Political Director of Yes Equality, working closely with political parties and political leaders from across the political spectrum to maximise and coordinate the impact of the campaign. The national campaign won with a 62% vote in favour of marriage equality making Ireland the first country in the world to have passed marriage equality by a public vote.

In March 2015 Brady launched Ireland's first community based rapid HIV testing programme, the Knownow project. It became Europe's most successful testing programme of its kind.

Equality campaigner – Australian Marriage Equality
In 2016, Brady moved to Australia to work with Australian Marriage Equality. The coalition government led by Prime Minister Malcolm Turnbull had a policy of holding a national plebiscite to decide the issue. Brady designed the strategy to both prepare for the plebiscite if it happened whilst working to defeat the proposition and get parliament to pass marriage equality by a vote in parliament. As Director, he launched the Equality Campaign, a joint campaign by Australian Marriage Equality and Australians 4 Equality to push for marriage equality. The proposal to hold a plebiscite on marriage equality was defeated in the Australian Senate on 8 November 2016. With the plebiscite successfully defeated, the Equality campaign campaigned to get parliament to vote on marriage equality in 2017. In the summer of 2017 the government announced it would hold a postal survey through the Australian Bureau of Statistics as a proxy public vote on the marriage equality.

Brady had designed a campaign approach that focussed on fairness and equality as the key message delivered through human stories. The approach was to be respectful and positive, avoiding angry debates with the activists from the No campaign. He believed real victory for LGBTI people was not about defeating others but persuading them. He believes divisive campaigns do not create the real change that LGBTI people need because whilst it may change the law it will also damage the social fabric and the daily lives of LGBTI people and that campaigns therefore need to focus on the social cohesion and peace that must follow any campaign on marriage equality. The campaign stuck rigidly to this approach.

On the 15th the results of the survey were announced. They were a major victory for the Yes campaign with 62% of Australians voting in favour of the marriage equality. There was a majority in favour in every State and Territory and in almost 90% of parliamentary electorates. On the morning of the results Brady addressed a crowd of over 10,000 in Sydney with the clear message that Marriage Equality must be a moment of national unity and social peace and that people needed to reach out to those who had voted no in the survey and continue the work of persuasion. Australia joined Ireland as the only two countries in the world to pass marriage equality by a public vote and Brady has been at the forefront of winning both.

Humanitarian work – Equal Future 2018
In 2018, Brady acted as spokesperson for Equal Future 2018, an international humanitarian campaign raising awareness of the damage done to children when they feel that being LGBT would be a misfortune or a disappointment, and aiming to shift behavior towards children and young people, across the world, right away. The Campaign launched in Dublin on Wednesday 22 August 2018, with the backing of more than 100 LGBT groups in more than 60 countries, urging use of its website for people to tell their stories to delegates at the Catholic Church's 'Synod on Young People', the Fifteenth Ordinary General Assembly of the Synod of Bishops . The press conference included Irish journalist Ursula Halligan and the Campaign had been endorsed to the press by former President of Ireland Mary McAleese two days before. The following Sunday, on his flight back from Dublin where the launch occurred, Pope Francis was asked what he would say to the father of a son who says he is homosexual. In his reply, the Pope said "Don’t condemn. Dialogue, understand, make space for your son or daughter. Make space so they can express themselves," "You are my son, you are my daughter, just as you are!" and "that son and that daughter have the right to a family and of not being chased out of the family." Brady launched, with Italian Senator Monica Cirrinna and former President of Apulia Nichi Vendola, amongst others, the Equal Future Campaign's YouGov survey of attitudes in the Catholic world towards damage to children and young people from LGBT stigma. The poll found that half of adults across eight countries – Brazil, Mexico, the Philippines, the United States, France, Italy, Spain, and Colombia – agreed with the statement "It could be damaging to a child/ young person's mental health and well-being if they felt that being LGBT was a misfortune or disappointment," while 23% disagreed, and that 63% of practicing Catholics in those countries agreed that Catholic Church should reconsider its current teaching on LGBT issues to help support the mental health and well-being of children and young people.

Personal life 
Brady was born in Enniskillen, County Fermanagh and grew up in the Republic of Ireland in Bundoran, County Donegal. He studied at University College Dublin (UCD), where he became chairman of the Kevin Barry Cumann.

Brady has a degree in economics from UCD and a Masters in International Relations from DCU. In 1995 he was diagnosed with acute leukaemia and spent 7 months undergoing chemotherapy in St James's Hospital, Dublin. He has three sisters, one of whom is Tara Brady, film reviewer with The Irish Times. He identifies as gay.

References

Alumni of University College Dublin
Alumni of Dublin City University
LGBT rights activists from Northern Ireland
Irish gay men
Australian LGBT rights activists
Irish LGBT rights activists
Year of birth missing (living people)
People from Enniskillen
People from Bundoran
Gay politicians
Same-sex marriage in Australia
Living people